was a JR East railway station located in Ōfunato, Iwate Prefecture, Japan. The station was closed after the 2011 Tōhoku earthquake and tsunami and has now been replaced by a provisional bus rapid transit line.

Lines
Shimofunato Station was served by the Ōfunato Line, and was located 100.2 rail kilometers from the terminus of the line at Ichinoseki Station.

Station layout
Shimofunato Station had a single side platform serving traffic in both directions.  The station was unattended.

History
Shimofunato Station opened on 3 September 1934. The station was absorbed into the JR East network upon the privatization of the Japan National Railways (JNR) on April 1, 1987. The station was closed after the 11 March 2011 Tōhoku earthquake and tsunami.

Surrounding area
  National Route 45
Shimofunato Shell Mound (National Historic Site)

External links

 JR East Station information 

Railway stations in Iwate Prefecture
Ōfunato Line
Railway stations in Japan opened in 1934
Railway stations closed in 2011